Jammu & Kashmir Bank Football Club (simply known as J&K Bank FC or J&K Bank XI) is an Indian professional football club based in Jammu and Kashmir, that competes in the JKFA Professional League. It is an institutional club as they are owned by Jammu & Kashmir Bank and was founded in 1984. The U-18 team played in Elite League. The senior team also participated in the first edition of Real Kashmir Cup.

History

Foundation
The J&K Bank Football Team was founded in 1984. Since that time they took part in several football tournaments. In 2007 the team won the north zone of National Football League Third Division and got promoted to National Football League Second Division.

Foundation of J&K Bank Football Academy
J&K Bank Football Club was formed as an initiative to nurture and expand the success story of J&K Bank Football Academy, which began its journey in 2011. The young players were identified, chosen, picked up and trained by the J&K Bank Academy to become the football players they are at present in top clubs of Indian football league system.

In the very first year of establishment in 2011, the academy team won B-division state league and qualified for the A-division. Then in the next season, they lifted A-division trophy to achieve their spot in state super division.

The latest success achieved by the academy team is winning the Christmas Gold Cup in 2020 at the Govt. Gandhi Memorial Science College ground in Jammu.

As professional club
As J&K Bank FC, they began their journey through participating in JKFA Professional League in the 2020–21 season.

In April 2021, J&K Bank as a professional club, achieved success in the 28th annual J&K Football Championship, delivering title winning performance against rivals Real Kashmir Reserves at the TRC Turf Ground.

In 2021, the team participated in the inaugural season of JKFA Professional League, the first professional league in the Indian state of Jammu and Kashmir, organised by Jammu and Kashmir Football Association (JKFA) and J&K Sports Council.

Notable players 
Danish Farooq Bhat
Farhan Ganie

Managerial history
 Manzoor Ahmad (2019–2020)
 Hilal Rasool (2020–present)

Honours

Domestic league
 National Football League III 
Champions (1): 2006–07
J&K Premier Football League
Champions (3): 2017, 2020, 2021
JKFA Professional League
Champions (1): 2021

Domestic cups
J&K Football Championship Trophy
Champions (3): 2017 (as J&K Bank Academy), 2020, 2021
G.V. Raja Football Tournament
Champions (1): 2010
Christmas Gold Cup
Champions (1): 2020
Delhi Lt. Governor's Cup
Champions (1): 200708
Runners-up (1): 2005
Positive Kashmir Football Championship
Champions (2): 2021, 2022

See also
List of football clubs in India
Sports in Jammu and Kashmir

References

External links
J&K Bank Football Club official at Facebook.com
J&K Bank Football Club at the-aiff.com

Football clubs in Jammu and Kashmir
Sport in Srinagar
Financial services association football clubs in India